Centralia is a city in Nemaha County, Kansas, United States.  As of the 2020 census, the population of the city was 485.

History
Centralia was founded in 1859, one mile north of the present town. When a railroad was built through the territory in 1867, Centralia was moved to the site. Centralia was incorporated in 1882. One of the early residents of Centralia was Floyd Perry Baker, a Kansas politician and newspaper editor, who moved there with his family from Andrew County, Missouri around 1860.

In 1901, Centralia was the scene of violent conflicts between whites and African Americans. By this time, Centralia had a sundown town policy forbidding blacks from living in the area.

Geography
Centralia is located at  (39.724032, -96.131079).

Climate
This climatic region is typified by large seasonal temperature differences, with warm to hot (and often humid) summers and cold (sometimes severely cold) winters.  According to the Köppen Climate Classification system, Centralia has a humid continental climate, abbreviated "Dfa" on climate maps.

Demographics

2010 census
As of the census of 2010, there were 512 people, 201 households, and 123 families residing in the city. The racial makeup of the city was 94.5% White, 1.2% African American, 0.8% Native American, 0.8% Asian, 0.6% from other races, and 2.1% from two or more races. Hispanic or Latino of any race were 2.5% of the population.

There were 201 households, of which 30.8% had children under the age of 18 living with them, 48.8% were married couples living together, 8.5% had a female householder with no husband present, 4.0% had a male householder with no wife present, and 38.8% were non-families. 35.3% of all households were made up of individuals, and 19.9% had someone living alone who was 65 years of age or older. The average household size was 2.38 and the average family size was 3.02.

The median age in the city was 40.1 years. 25% of residents were under the age of 18; 5.7% were between the ages of 18 and 24; 25.4% were from 25 to 44; 22.8% were from 45 to 64; and 21.1% were 65 years of age or older. The gender makeup of the city was 50.6% male and 49.4% female.

2000 census
As of the census of 2000, there were 534 people, 216 households, and 127 families residing in the city. The racial makeup of the city was 96.82% White, 0.19% African American, 0.94% Native American, 0.37% Pacific Islander, 0.19% from other races, and 1.50% from two or more races. Hispanic or Latino of any race were 2.81% of the population.

There were 216 households, out of which 27.3% had children under the age of 18 living with them, 54.6% were married couples living together, 3.7% had a female householder with no husband present, and 41.2% were non-families. 38.9% of all households were made up of individuals, and 28.7% had someone living alone who was 65 years of age or older. The average household size was 2.29 and the average family size was 3.13.

In the city, the population was spread out, with 25.7% under the age of 18, 5.1% from 18 to 24, 21.7% from 25 to 44, 17.2% from 45 to 64, and 30.3% who were 65 years of age or older. The median age was 44 years. For every 100 females, there were 87.4 males. For every 100 females age 18 and over, there were 83.8 males.

The median income for a household in the city was $22,240, and the median income for a family was $32,625. Males had a median income of $22,500 versus $16,591 for females. The per capita income for the city was $14,813. About 8.0% of families and 14.5% of the population were below the poverty line, including 19.3% of those under age 18 and 16.6% of those age 65 or over.

Notable people
 Floyd Baker, Kansas politician, lawyer, newspaper editor
 John Riggins, NFL running back

See also
 Central Branch Union Pacific Railroad

References

External links

 
 Centralia - Directory of Public Officials
 USD 380, local school district
 Centralia city map, KDOT

Cities in Kansas
Cities in Nemaha County, Kansas
Sundown towns in Kansas
1859 establishments in Kansas Territory